Queen of Burlesque is a 1946 murder mystery film starring Evelyn Ankers and directed by Sam Newfield. Rose La Rose, who played Blossom Terrain, was a stripper in real life and, according to Variety, a "runway peeler with considerable experience." She portrays a supporting character and has one feature dance, a faux "Arabian Fantasy" that is not a striptease.

Plot
When striptease artiste Blossom Terraine is strangled backstage at a burlesque theater, fellow dancer Crystal is suspected of the murder. Crystal's reporter boyfriend Steve turns detective in an attempt to prove her innocence.

Cast
Evelyn Ankers as Crystal McCoy
Carleton G. Young as Steve Hurley
Marion Martin as Lola Cassell
Craig Reynolds as Joe Nolan
Rose La Rose as Blossom Terrain
Emory Parnell as Police Insp. Tom Crowley
Murray Leonard as Chick Malloy
Alice Fleming as Annie Morris
Jacqueline Dalya as Dolly DeVoe
Charles 'Red' Marshall as Johnson (as Red Marshall)
Charles King as Dugan

Critical reception
Leonard Maltin described it as "low-budget suspenser unstrung backstage at burlesque theater"; while TV Guide called it "a standard programmer, racier than most of its type thanks to the burlesque setting. Nonetheless, the dialog and mystery are routine. Acting and production values are adequate for the material."

References

External links
 Queen of Burlesque in the Internet Movie Database

1946 films
1946 mystery films
1940s English-language films
Films directed by Sam Newfield
Producers Releasing Corporation films
American mystery films
American black-and-white films
1940s American films